Schizolaena raymondii is a tree in the family Sarcolaenaceae. It is endemic to Madagascar. It is named for the botanist Raymond Rabevohitra.

Description
Its subcoriaceous leaves are elliptic to obovate in shape and coloured greenish brown above and khaki green below. The inflorescences are found near branch tips, each bearing up to 12 flowers. Each flower has three sepals and five petals.

Distribution and habitat
Schizolaena raymondii is known only from the northern region of Sava where it is restricted to a single locality in the Ambondrobe forest. Its habitat is humid forest from sea-level to  altitude.

Threats
Although abundant in its single location, the species is not in a protected area, leaving it threatened by human pressures.

References

raymondii
Endemic flora of Madagascar
Trees of Madagascar
Plants described in 2006